Olivia Lake is a lake in Alberta.

Beaver County, Alberta
Olivia Lake